Terry Davis is the Dean of St George's Cathedral, Georgetown, Guyana. He is the 17th person to hold the post.

Notes 

Deans of St George's Cathedral, Georgetown

Living people
Year of birth missing (living people)